The South Africa women's under-19 cricket team represents South Africa in international under-19 women's cricket. The team is administrated by Cricket South Africa.

The team played their first official international matches against India in late 2022 and early 2023, in preparation for the 2023 ICC Under-19 Women's T20 World Cup, the first ever international women's under-19 cricket competition, held in South Africa. They reached the Super Six stage at the inaugural tournament.

History
The inaugural Women's Under-19 World Cup was scheduled to take place in January 2021, but was postponed multiple times due to the COVID-19 pandemic. The tournament was eventually scheduled to take place in 2023, in South Africa. As the host nation, South Africa qualified automatically for the tournament.

In December 2022, the side competed in one of South Africa's domestic competitions, the Women's T20 Super League, losing all of their completed matches. Later in December and in January 2023, they played a five-match T20I series against India. At the Under-19 T20 World Cup, the side reached the Super Six stage, in which they finished fourth in their group.

Recent call-ups
The table below lists all the players who have been selected in recent squads for South Africa under-19s. Currently, this includes the squad for their series against India and the 2023 ICC Under-19 Women's T20 World Cup.

Records & statistics
International match summary

As of 24 January 2023

Youth Women's Twenty20 record versus other nations

As of 24 January 2023

Leading runs scorers

Leading wickets takers

Highest individual innings

Highest individual bowling figures

Under-19 World Cup record

References

Women's Under-19 cricket teams
C
South Africa in international cricket